Valve Amplification Company (VAC) is a U.S. supplier of high end audio electronics, principally utilizing vacuum tube technology. It was founded in 1990 by Kevin Hayes (b. 1959) and Channing W. Hayes (1923–2009). A Florida corporation, as of 2011 it is located in Sarasota, Florida, U.S.

It is well known for having produced the Marantz Classic series of amplifiers for Marantz Japan from 1996 to 1998 (Marantz Model 7 / 7C, Model 8B, Model 9), as well as the VAC-designed Model 66 integrated amplifier. In addition, it redeveloped and produced the first 200 recreations of the LA-2A leveling amplifier for Universal Audio in 1998.

Company history

VAC was founded in 1990 by Kevin Hayes and his father, Channing W. Hayes in Sarasota, Florida. The first products were the PA45 and PA90 power amplifiers, designed jointly. Beginning with their second product, the CPA1 / CLA1 preamplifier, designs are largely the work of Kevin Hayes, who functions as chief engineer.

VAC continued to operate in Florida until the beginning of the Marantz Classic project, the production phase of which commenced in Durham, NC in January 1996. VAC returned its administrative and sales operations to Sarasota, FL in September 2001.

On June 10, 2014, Kevin Hayes was issued U.S. Patent 8,749,310 for "amplifier bias control". This patent covers the only known technique for observing the true underlying quiescent current (idle current) of an output tube (or transistor) under dynamic signal conditions, and then holding it to the stable target value with a precision of 99% or better. It is the only 'auto bias' system in which the volume and character of the music being played does not alter the idle point of the tube. It is incorporated in VAC power amplifiers as the iQ Intelligent Continuous Automatic Bias System. In addition, the iQ system defends against short circuit tubes, prevents gas current run away tubes, indicates weakening tubes, and minimizes noise and distortion. Current iQ models are the VAC Statement 450 iQ and Signature 200 iQ.

VAC is privately held.

Notable products 

 PA45 & PA90 power amplifier, 1990–1997
 Renaissance Series (R30/30, R30/70, R70/70, R140), 1993–2009
 Phi Beta 110i integrated amplifier, 2004–2008
 Signature Preamplifier, 1999–present
 Avatar Series integrated amplifier, 1998–2008
 Phi 200 power amplifier, 2007–present
 Phi 300 Series power amplifier, 2006–present
 Statement 450 power amplifier, 2010–present

External links 

 Official VAC company website
 Review of VAC Phi 200 Power Amplifier in UltraAudio
 Review of VAC Phi 200 Amplifier (Italian)
 Review of VAC Phi 200 Power Amplifier in DaGoGo
 Review of VAC Renaissance Mk III Preamplifier in UltraAudio
 Review of VAC Signature Mk II Preamplifier in DaGoGo
 Review of VAC Signature Mk II Preamplifier in InnerEar magazine (Canada)
 Review of early VAC Signature Mk II Preamplifier in Stereophile magazine
 Comparison of VAC tube electronics with Krell and Lexicon solid state electronics from Sound & Vision magazine
 Brief review of the VAC Marantz Classic project
 Article referencing VAC and Kevin Hayes from Scientific American
 U.S. Patent 8,749,310, iQ Intelligent Continuous Automatic Bias System

1990 establishments in Florida
Companies based in Sarasota, Florida
Valve amplifiers
Electronics companies established in 1990